The 48th Infantry Brigade Combat Team (48th IBCT) ("Macon Volunteers") is a modular infantry brigade of the Georgia Army National Guard.  One of the oldest units in U.S. Army history, the lineage of the 48th Infantry Brigade can be traced back to 1825. It is one of few units in the US military that also saw service as a unit of the Confederate States of America during the American Civil War.  Today, the 48th IBCT is part of the U.S. Army's "Associated Units" program where it's aligned under the 3rd Infantry Division, a combined arms (armor and mechanized infantry) combat maneuver unit of the Regular Army.

History and lineage

Background
The 48th Infantry Brigade Combat Team was originally organized on 23 April 1825, at Macon, Georgia as the "Macon Volunteers, Georgia Volunteer Militia". It mustered into Federal service on 18 February 1836, at Picolata, Florida, as "Captain Seymor's Company, 1st Battalion Georgia Volunteers".

The unit was brought into Confederate service on 20 April 1861 at Macon, and was reorganized and redesignated on 22 April 1861 as Company D, 2nd Battalion, Georgia Infantry. Surrendered 9 April 1865 at Appomattox, Virginia.

It reorganized on 11 April 1872 as the Macon Volunteers, and reorganized and redesignated 15 June 1874 as Company B, 2nd Battalion. It reorganized and redesignated on 23 January 1891 as Company B, 2nd Infantry Regiment. Mustered into federal service 11–14 May 1898 at Griffin, Georgia as Company F, 1st Georgia Volunteer Infantry; and mustered out of service on 18 November 1898 at Macon, Georgia and resumed state status as Company B, 2nd Infantry Regiment. The unit was redesignated on 21 December 1899, as Georgia State Troopers; and on 1 October 1905 as the Georgia National Guard. The unit was drafted into federal service in August 1917 as Company B, 151st Machine Gun Battalion, an element of the 42nd Division. It demobilized in May 1919 at Camp Gordon, Georgia.

The unit was reorganized and federally recognized 29 November 1920 in the Georgia National Guard at Macon, Georgia as Company H, 1st Infantry. Redesignated 8 March 1921 as Company B, 1st Infantry. Redesignated 1 July 1922 as Company B, 122nd Infantry Regiment.

It was reorganized and redesignated on 28 November 1922 as Headquarters Company, 59th Infantry Brigade, an element of the 30th Division. It was inducted into federal service on 16 September 1940 at Macon, and was redesignated on 16 February 1942 as the 30th Cavalry Reconnaissance Troop while remaining assigned to the 30th Infantry Division. It was redesignated 11 August 1943 as the 30th Reconnaissance Troop, Mechanized. It was deactivated on 17 November 1945 at Fort Jackson, South Carolina.

From 1945 to 1973, the brigade underwent a series of redesignations culminating in its current form, the 48th Infantry Brigade. It reorganized and was federally recognized 12 December 1946 as Headquarters Company, 121st Infantry, an element of the 48th Infantry Division. Converted and redesignated 1 November 1955 as Headquarters and Headquarters Company, Combat Command B, 48th Armored Division. Reorganized and redesignated 16 April 1963 as Headquarters and Headquarters Company, 1st Brigade, 48th Armored Division. Converted and redesignated 1 January 1968 as Headquarters and Headquarters Company, 3d Brigade, 30th Infantry Division. It consolidated on 1 December 1973 with the 182nd Military Police Company and the consolidated unit was reorganized and redesignated as Headquarters and Headquarters Company, 48th Infantry Brigade.  USArmypatches.com says the separate brigade insignia was Worn from 16 April 1974 – 5 June 1999.

The unit was inducted into federal service on 30 November 1990 at Fort Stewart, GA. That year, more than 4,500 members of the unit were mobilized to participate in Operation Desert Storm. The unit completed training conducted at the Army's National Training Center in California, and was first and only National Guard combat brigade validated as combat ready for the Gulf War. However, the brigade was criticized for being underprepared for war. The conflict ended before the brigade could be employed in the Persian Gulf and It subsequently demobilized on 10 April 1991 at Fort Stewart. The unit was awarded the Georgia Special Operations Ribbon by the State of Georgia for the mobilization.   Mobilized Soldiers were also awarded the Armed Forces Reserve Medal with "M" device, along with the National Defense Service Medal (NDSM) for the period 2 August 1990 and 30 November 1995.

In June 1999, the 48th Infantry Brigade (Enhanced) (Mechanized) became part of the newly re-flagged 24th Infantry Division. In 2006, the 24th Infantry Division was inactivated and the 48th Infantry Brigade Combat Team became part of the 35th Infantry Division, headquartered at Fort Leavenworth, KS.

The unit also has a training associate relationship with the 3rd Infantry Division (Mechanized).

Bosnia
Elements of the 48th Infantry Brigade deployed to Bosnia and Herzegovina for Stabilization Force (SFOR) Rotation 9 to provide support operations for Task Force Eagle (United States contingent to United Nations Operations in support of Dayton Peace Accord). The SFOR9 rotation was scheduled from April to October 2001. The Georgia units were mobilized under a Presidential Selective Reserve Call Up. While other National Guard units have participated in the Bosnia operations in the past, the 48th Infantry Brigade (Mechanized) was among the first National Guard combat units of this size and capability to take over such a large and significant portion of the mission.

Iraq

In October 2004, the 48th Infantry Brigade was notified that it would be mobilized into federal service in support of the Global War on Terrorism. Elements of the brigade began mobilizing in December 2004 at Fort Stewart, Georgia, with the remainder of the brigade entering federal service in early January 2005. The brigade completed five months of training, including a rotation at the National Training Center, Fort Irwin, California and was validated as combat-ready.
In May 2005, the unit began deploying to Iraq as part of Operation Iraqi Freedom III (the third major U.S. military rotation of forces into the area of operations) and experienced some of the fiercest combat actions in the campaign. The brigade was assigned to Multi-National Division – Baghdad (MND-B) under the control of the 3rd Infantry Division and was responsible for a sector of southwest Baghdad, nicknamed the Triangle of Death. It replaced the 2nd Brigade, 10th Mountain Division. The brigade was headquartered at Camp Stryker, part of the Victory Base Complex (VBC). Elements of the 48th Brigade occupied and maintained forward operating bases (FOBs) in Mahmudiyah, Lutifiyah, Latifiyah, and Yusifiyah; and established a new joint United States/Iraqi Army permanent patrol base, designated PB Lion's Den, located to the west of the Radwaniyah Palace Complex.

The 48th Brigade conducted a unique brigade-wide change of mission in October 2005, taking over the Iraq Theater of Operations 

(ITO) security mission from the 56th Brigade Combat Team. The 2nd Brigade, 101st Airborne Division replaced 48th Brigade units in Baghdad. The brigade's headquarters relocated to Camp Adder (also known as Ali Air Base or Tallil Air Base) in vicinity of Nasiriyah, Iraq, and the brigade had elements stationed as far south as Kuwait to as far north as Mosul, and as far west as the Syrian border.

On 20 April 2006, at Ft. Stewart, more than 4,000 members of the brigade began to return home after a year of combat operations in Iraq. The 20 April arrival marked the first of nearly a dozen flights over the subsequent weeks that brought the soldiers back to Georgia.

During this period, the 48th Infantry Brigade became the first unit in the Army to receive the new Army Combat Uniform in place of the older Battle Dress Uniform.

Afghanistan
In December 2007, the 48th Infantry Brigade Combat Team was alerted that it will be deployed to Afghanistan in the summer of 2009 in support of Operation Enduring Freedom (OEF). This rotation reflects the continued U.S. commitment to assisting in the security of Afghanistan and the development of the Afghan National Security Forces. Afghan forces continue to improve capability and assume responsibility for security. Force levels in Afghanistan continue to be conditions-based, and are determined based on the recommendations of military commanders in Afghanistan and in consultation with the government of the Islamic Republic of Afghanistan.

The first elements of the 48th Brigade began training in January 2009 in preparation for a year-long deployment to Afghanistan.

In 2009, more than 3000 Guardsmen deployed from the 1st Battalion, 121st Infantry, headquartered in Winder, GA; 2nd Battalion, 121st Infantry, headquartered in Griffin, GA; 1st Battalion, 118th Field Artillery, headquartered in Savannah, GA; 1st Battalion, 108th Cavalry, headquartered in Calhoun, GA; 148th Brigade Special Troops Battalion, headquartered in Statesboro, GA; and the 48th Brigade Support Battalion, headquartered in Dublin, GA to support Operation Enduring Freedom. The 48th IBCT returned home in March 2010 after being replaced by the 86th IBCT (MTN).

The 48th IBCT suffered eight casualties while deployed to Afghanistan: MAJ Kevin M. Jenrette (4 June 2009, 1–108th Cavalry), SFC John C. Beale (4 June 2009, 1–108th Cavalry), SGT Jeffrey W. Jordan (4 June 2009, 1–108th Cavalry), 1SG John D. Blair (20 June 2009, 1–121st Infantry), SGT Isaac Johnson, Jr. (6 July 2009, 1–108th Cavalry), SGT Brock Chavers (6 July 2009, 2–121st Infantry), SGT Raymundo P. Morales (21 July 2009, 1–108th Cavalry), and SSG Alex French IV (30 September 2009, 1–121st Infantry).

3rd Infantry Division
In March 2016, the 48th Infantry Brigade was selected to participate in Associated Units pilot program. The program established a formal relationship between reserve and active duty components, allowing units to train and eventually deploy together. 
The 48th Brigade was paired with Task Force 1-28th Infantry Regiment, stationed at Fort Benning. The brigade was also associated with the active Army's 3rd Infantry Division at Fort Stewart. The soldiers of the 48th Brigade wear the 3rd Infantry Division patch, but retained the 48th Brigade "Macon Volunteers" designation.

Order of battle

Current units
48th Infantry Brigade Combat Team (IBCT)
48th IBCT Headquarters, Macon, Georgia
177th Brigade Engineer Battalion (BEB)
 Headquarters and Headquarters Company (HHC), Statesboro, Georgia
 A Company, Glennville, Georgia
 B Company, Douglas, Georgia
 C Company, Macon, Georgia
 D Company, Forest Park, Georgia
1st Squadron, 108th Cavalry Regiment—Reconnaissance, Surveillance, and Target Acquisition (RSTA)
 Headquarters and Headquarters Troop (HHT), Calhoun, Georgia
 A Troop, Cedartown, Georgia
 B Troop, Canton, Georgia
 C Company, Dalton, Georgia
1st Battalion, 121st Infantry Regiment (Slayers)
 HHC, Winder, Georgia
 A Company, Lawrenceville, Georgia
 B Company, Covington, Georgia
 C Company, Gainesville, Georgia
 D Company, Milledgeville, Georgia
2nd Battalion, 121st Infantry Regiment (Warriors)
 HHC, Forsyth, Georgia
 A Company, Griffin, Georgia
 B Company, Newnan, Georgia
 C Company, Cordele, Georgia
 D Company, Valdosta, Georgia
Task Force 1-28th Infantry Regiment
 HHC, Fort Benning, Georgia
 A Company, Fort Benning, Georgia
 B Company, Fort Benning, Georgia
 C Company, Fort Benning, Georgia
 D Company, Fort Benning, Georgia
 E Company (Engineers), Fort Benning, Georgia
 F Company (Field Artillery), Fort Benning, Georgia
 G Company (Forward Support Company), Fort Benning, Georgia
3rd Battalion, 121st Infantry Regiment (Pathfinders)
 HHC, Cumming, Georgia
 A Company, Cumming, Georgia
 B Company, Atlanta, Georgia
 C Company, Atlanta, Georgia
 D Company, Atlanta, Georgia
1st Battalion, 118th Field Artillery Regiment
 Headquarters and Headquarters Battery (HHB), Savannah, Georgia
 A Battery (105mm), Springfield, Georgia
 B Battery (105mm), Brunswick, Georgia
 C Battery (155mm), Savannah, Georgia 
148th Brigade Support Battalion (BSB)
 HHC, Macon, Georgia
 Alpha Company (Transportation), Dublin, Georgia
 Bravo Company (Maintenance), Jackson, Georgia
 Charlie Company (Medical), Macon, Georgia
 Delta Company (1st Squadron, 108th Cavalry Regiment), Calhoun, Georgia
 Echo Company (177th Brigade Engineer Battalion), Metter, Georgia
 Fox Company (1st Battalion, 118th Field Artillery Regiment), Savannah, Georgia
 Golf Company (1st Battalion, 121st Infantry Regiment), Winder, Georgia
 Hotel Company (2nd Battalion, 121st Infantry Regiment), Albany, Georgia
 India Company (3rd Battalion, 121st Infantry Regiment), Cumming, Georgia

Pre-Modular
48th Infantry Brigade (Enhanced) (Mechanized)
 HHC
 1st Battalion, 121st Infantry
 2nd Battalion, 121st Infantry
 1st Battalion, 108th Armor
 1st Battalion, 118th Field Artillery (previously 1st Battalion, 230th Field Artillery)
 148th Brigade Support Battalion
 648th Engineer Battalion
 Troop E, 108th Cavalry
 248th Military Intelligence Company
 Battery E, 179th Air Defense Artillery

References

External links
 About Us: 48th Infantry Brigade Combat Team
 GlobalSecurity.org: 48th Infantry Brigade
 The Institute of Heraldry: 48th Infantry Brigade Combat Team
 48th Infantry Brigade Combat Team Facebook

Infantry 048
Infantry 999 048
Infantry 999 048
Military units and formations established in 1825